Han Xinyun (born 30 May 1990), also known as Monica Han, is a Chinese professional tennis player.

Han has won three doubles titles on the WTA Tour, as well as one doubles title on the WTA Challenger Tour. She also has won nine singles and 26 doubles titles on the ITF Women's Circuit. On 24 October 2016, she reached her best singles ranking of world No. 105. On 29 July 2019, she peaked at No. 50 in the WTA doubles rankings.

Playing for China Fed Cup team, Han has a win–loss record of 2–1 as of July 2022.

Personal
The only child of father Han Lei and mother Fu Deyuan first played tennis at the age of seven. Han Xinyun is coached by Wang Hufu. Her tennis idol is Li Na, her favorite tournaments are the Australian Open and China Open.

Career
Han had reached a WTA Tour doubles final before in China where she and her partner Xu Yifan lost to the pairing of Caroline Wozniacki and Anabel Medina Garrigues.

In 2010, Han made her Grand Slam debut, as she went through qualifying to reach the first round of the Australian Open. Also, she made her Fed Cup debut, in which she helped China get its only singles rubber win against Slovakia.

In 2016, she won her first doubles title on the WTA Tour at the Hobart International, partnering Christina McHale and defeating Kimberly Birrell and Jarmila Wolfe, in two straight sets.

Performance timelines

Singles

Doubles

Significant finals

WTA Elite Trophy

Doubles: 1 (1 title)

WTA career finals

Doubles: 10 (3 titles, 7 runner-ups)

WTA Challenger finals

Doubles: 6 (1 title, 5 runner-ups)

ITF Circuit finals

Singles: 18 (9 titles, 9 runner–ups)

Doubles: 45 (26 titles, 19 runner–ups)

See also
 Tennis in China

Notes

References

External links
 
 
 

1990 births
Living people
Chinese female tennis players
People from Jinzhou
Tennis players from Liaoning
Tennis players at the 2010 Asian Games
Asian Games competitors for China
21st-century Chinese women